The 2018 ACC men's basketball tournament was the postseason men's basketball tournament for the Atlantic Coast Conference held at Barclays Center in Brooklyn, New York from March 6–10, 2018.  It was the 65th annual edition of the tournament, and the second year in a row being held at Barclays Center.  The Virginia Cavaliers entered the tournament as the top seed, with a 17–1 conference record (28–2 overall) under the guidance of Tony Bennett.  UVA also began the tournament unanimously ranked number 1 in the country in both major polls.

The Cavaliers defeated Louisville 75–58 and Clemson 64–58 to secure a place in the tournament championship game.  They defeated North Carolina 71–63 in the championship game to become tournament champion. Sophomore guard Kyle Guy was named Tournament MVP. Games were shown on over-the-air television in local media markets by the syndicated ACCN and simulcast nationally on various ESPN cable networks.

Both the Virginia–North Carolina title game and Duke–North Carolina semifinal game set the Barclays Center attendance record for college basketball games, and conference leadership vowed to return the ACC Tournament to New York in the near future.

Seeds
All 15 ACC teams participated in the tournament. Teams were seeded by record within the conference, with a tiebreaker system to seed teams with identical conference records.  The tournament was held over five consecutive days.  Teams ranked 10–15 played on the first day; teams ranked 5–9 entered the bracket on the second day, with teams ranked 1–4 entering on the third day (quarterfinals).  The semifinals were played on the fourth day, and the finals on the last day.

Schedule
All games will be televised on the ACC Network within the ACC footprint and simulcast nationally on the ESPN networks denoted below.

Bracket

Game summaries

First round
Three games were played in the first round.  In all three, the higher seed advanced.

In the first game, the 12-seed Boston College Eagles took on the 13-seed Georgia Tech Yellow Jackets.  Boston College got out to ten point lead at half time.  They opened the second half on a 15-5 run, bring their lead to 20 with under 14 minutes to play.  A late flurry of scoring by Georgia Tech reduced the Eagles lead to 6 with only 45 seconds remaining, but BC hit four free throws at the end of the game, ending the chance of a Yellow Jacket comeback. Georgia Tech's Tadric Jackson led all scorers with 29 points in the losing effort.

The second game featured the 10-seed Notre Dame Fighting Irish against the 15-seed Pittsburgh Panthers.  The game looked to be one of the biggest mismatches in the tournament, with Notre Dame likely post-season bound with a 20-win season and Pittsburgh entering the tournament having lost every conference game and sporting a woeful 8-24 record.  Instead, the two teams played the closest game of the first round, with Notre Dame clinging to a two-point lead with less than a minute remaining; however a controversial loose-ball foul against Pitt's Marcus Carr followed by a turnover by Carr allowed Notre Dame to preserve their lead and close out the game 67-64.  Carr's late game mistakes were ironic as his three-pointer was the one that cut the Notre Dame lead to two, and he scored 18 in the game, tied with Jared Wilson-Frame to lead the Panthers in scoring.  Notre Dame's Bonzie Colson led all scorers with 19.

The last game of the day featured the 11-seed Syracuse Orange versus the 14-seed Wake Forest Demon Deacons.  Syracuse was playing with a short bench, as several injuries limited their ability to substitute.  Despite leading by 19 with under eight minutes to play, the wear on Syracuse's starters showed, as they played all but the last 32 seconds of the second half, and that substitution was forced by Tyus Battle's fifth foul of the game.  The Demon Deacons had cut the lead to six with fresher legs, but the Orange held on to win 73-64. Wake Forest's Bryant Crawford led all scoring with 22 points.

Second round

Quarterfinals

Semifinals

Championship

Awards and honors 
Tournament MVP: Kyle Guy

All-Tournament Teams:

First Team
 Kyle Guy, Virginia
 Theo Pinson, North Carolina
 Luke Maye, North Carolina
 Devon Hall, Virginia
 Marvin Bagley, Duke

Second Team
 Ty Jerome, Virginia
 Joel Berry, North Carolina
 Bonzie Colson, Notre Dame
 Shelton Mitchell, Clemson
 Ky Bowman, Boston College

See also

 2018 ACC women's basketball tournament

References

Tournament
ACC men's basketball tournament
Basketball competitions in New York City
College sports in New York City
Sports in Brooklyn
ACC men's basketball tournament
ACC men's basketball tournament
2010s in Brooklyn
Prospect Heights, Brooklyn